Montel is a given name and surname. Notable people with the name include:

Given name
Montel Vontavious Porter (born 1973), American professional wrestler
Montel Williams (born 1956), American television personality and television/radio talk show host

Surname
Blanche Montel (1902–1998), French actress
Eliane Montel (1898-1992), French physicist and chemist
Eugène Montel (1880–1966), French politician
Paul Montel (1876–1975), French mathematician

See also
 Montell, given name and surname

French-language surnames